John Gurney may refer to:

Norwich bankers
John Gurney (1655–1721), founder of the banking Quaker Gurney family
John Gurney (1719–1779), co-founder of Gurney's Bank in Norwich
John Gurney (1749–1809), father of Elizabeth Fry
John Gurney (1809–1856), eldest son of Samuel Gurney
John Gurney (mayor) (1845–1887), mayor of Norwich (1885)
John Henry Gurney Sr. (1819–1890), MP for King's Lynn and amateur ornithologist
John Henry Gurney Jr. (1848–1922), banker and ornithologist

Other people
John Gurney (bass-baritone), (1902—1997), American opera singer
John Gurney (football chairman), former chairman of Luton Town F.C.
Sir John Gurney (judge) (1768–1845), barrister and judge, of a family of noted stenographers
John Gurney (MP), MP for Norfolk (1399)
John Hampden Gurney (1802–1862), Anglican clergyman and hymnist
John Chandler Gurney (1896–1985), U.S. Senator from South Dakota

See also
Joseph John Gurney (1788–1847), significant figure in the history of the Quakers